Legal biography is the biography of persons relevant to law. In a preface dated October 1983, A. W. B. Simpson wrote that it was "a rather neglected field". Since then there has been a "resurgence of interest".

History
In 1835, Hoffman said:

See also
 Biographia Juridica

References
Notes

Bibliography
Legal Biography Project. London School of Economics, Department of Law.
Fenster, Mark. "The Folklore of Legal Biography" (2007) 105 Michigan Law Review 1265. University of Florida.
Henry and Thomas Roscoe (compilers). "Legal Biography" in Westminster Hall: or Professional Relics and Anectdotes of the Bar, Bench and Woolsack. John Knight & Henry Lacey. London. 1825. Volume 3. Pages 209–226. Digitized copy from Google Books.
Association of American Law Schools. "Reading and Writing Legal Biography" in 1977 Annual Meeting Proceedings. 1977. Part One. Page 23. Snippet view from Google Books.
Maxwell and Maxwell. A Legal Bibliography of the British Commonwealth of Nations. Sweet & Maxwell. London. 1955. Volume 1: English Law to 1800. Chapter 26 ("Biography").
"Historical value of legal biography" (1909) 29 Canadian Law Times 450
Nelson and Reid. "Legal Biography" in The Literature of American Legal History. Oceana Publications Inc. 1985. Reprinted by Beard Books. 2006. p 58.
2 Hoffman's Course of Legal Study 622
John McEldowney, "Challenges in Legal Biography: The Role of Biography in Legal History" (2004) 39 Irish Jurist 215 to 242
Alec Samuels, "Legal Biography" (1990) 154 Justice of the Peace 612 (22 September 1990)
Hampton L Carson, "The Interest and Value of the Study of Legal Biography" (1911) 23 The Green Bag 340; "The Study of Legal Biography" (1911) 131 The Law Times 328 (5 August 1911)
David R Williams, "Legal Biography in Canada: A New Field to Plow" (1980) 14 Gazette 329 (Law Society of Upper Canada)
Donald H J Hermann, "Patterns of Life in Law: A Consideration of Contemporary American Legal Biography" (1975) 24 DePaul Law Review 853 to 913 
Ignacio de la Rasilla. "Biographical Approaches to the History of International Law". International Law and History: Modern Interfaces. Cambridge University Press. 2021. Pages 308 to 338.
Kehinde Olaoye, "Legal biography and legal subjects". Viljoen, Sipalla and Adegalu (eds). Exploring African approaches to International Law. Pretoria University Law Press. 2022. Pages 67 to 69.
John B Nann and Morris L Cohen. "Biographical Materials". The Yale Law School Guide to Research in American Legal History. Yale University Press. 2018. Pages 283 to 293.
G Blain Baker, "Juristic Biographies, Homage Volumes and 'Tracings of Gerald Le Dain's Life in the Law'". Baker and Janda (eds). Tracings of Gerald Le Dain's Life in the Law. McGill Queens University Press. 2019. Page 3. See particularly "Juristic Biographies and Homage Volumes" at pages 4 to 9.
Leslie Dingle, "Legal Biography, Oral History and the Cambridge Eminent Scholars Archive" (2014) 14 Legal Information Management 58 to 68 University of London CUP
Yuliya Chenykh, "The Gust of Wind". Schill, Tams and Hofmann (eds). International Investment Law and History. Page 241 at pages 244 to 246.
Linda Mulcahy and David Sugarman. Legal Life-Writing: Marginalised Subjects and Sources. John Wiley & Sons. 2015. Google Books.
Linda Mulcahy and David Sugarman, "Introduction: Legal Life Writing and Marginalized Subjects and Sources" (2015) 42 Journal of Law and Society 1
David Sugarman, "From Legal Biography to Legal Life Writing: Broadening Conceptions of Legal History and Socio-legal Scholarship" (2015) 42 Journal of Law and Society 7
Rosie Auchmerty, "Recovering Lost Lives: Researching Women in Legal History" (2015) 42 Journal of Law and Society 34
Leslie J Moran, "Judicial Pictures as Legal Life-writing Data and a Research Method" (2015) 42 Journal of Law and Society 74
Aleksi Peltonen, "Approaching International Criminal Law through Life Writing". The New Histories of International Criminal Law. Page 220 et seq.

Legal professions
Biography (genre)